The Antilles Current is a highly variable surface ocean current of warm water that flows northeasterly past the island chain that separates the Caribbean Sea and the Atlantic Ocean. The current results from the flow of the Atlantic North Equatorial Current. This current completes the clockwise- cycle or convection (North Atlantic Gyre) that is located in the Atlantic Ocean.  It runs north of Puerto Rico, Hispaniola and Cuba, but south to the Bahamas, facilitating maritime communication from across the Atlantic into these islands' northern coasts, and connecting to the Gulf Stream at the intersection of the Florida Strait.  Because of its non-dominant pace and rich-nutrient waters, fishermen across the Caribbean Islands use it to fish. It moves almost parallel to the also rich-nutrient Caribbean Current which flows south of Puerto Rico and Cuba, and over Colombia and Venezuela.

See also

References

Geography of Puerto Rico
Geography of the Dominican Republic
Geography of Haiti
Geography of Cuba
Geography of the Turks and Caicos Islands
Currents of the Atlantic Ocean